Veun Sai is a commune in Veun Sai District in northeast Cambodia. It contains six villages and has a population of 2443. In the 2007 commune council elections, four seats went to members of the Cambodian People's Party and one seat went to a member of Funcinpec. Land alienation is a problem of moderate severity in Veun Sai. (See Ratanakiri Province for background information on land alienation.)

Villages

See also
Lygosoma veunsaiense first discovered at Veun Sai in 2010.

References

Communes of Ratanakiri province